Tim Flood may refer to:

 Tim Flood (baseball) (1877–1929),  baseball player
 Tim Flood (hurler) (1927–2014), Irish hurler